Lucca-Tassignano Airport is a public airport located in Tassignano, (Capannori), 5 km from the center of the city of Lucca.
The airport is open all days from 9:00 to 19:00, except on Tuesdays.
Currently, the airport is a base for various helicopter enabled shutdown forest fires (including an Erickson Air-Crane S-64
and a Eurocopter AS350) and for a flying school of the local aeroclub.

History
The airport, opened on 29 November 1932 as "airfield", it was made with the assistance of the Provincial Administration of Lucca.

In 1935 the airport passed under the control of the Royal Air Force who founded a military flight school.

During the war the airport was home to several departments and also  to the complementary group for aerial observation and the German units operating with Junkers 52. At the time of the abandonment of the Lucca's area, the Germans totaled it reducing the airport to a field without any structure aviation.

After the war period, the Ministry of Defense began to use the area for exercises of air drops of parachutists military unit based in Pisa and Livorno, reserving the south, 100 x 1033 meters to airport activity for the local flying clubs and other associations flight.

In 1961 at the initiative of the Aero Club of Lucca and at the request of local authorities it was re-opened to traffic.

In 1963, in view of the favorable location, the Italian Ministry of Defence declared it open to the national tourist traffic.

In 1982 the airport operator was assigned to the Provincial Consortium Lucca Airport. The remaining area was sold to the Administration of the Italian Army to use it as a launching area.

In 1997, following instructions issued by the Ministry of Transport that it had already taken ownership of the Ministry of Defense, it was named "Lucca-Tassignano Airport Ltd." that as of 1 January 1999 took over the management of the Consortium and still preserves modified in "Airport Capannori SpA".

In 2012 the inauguration of the new airport terminal building, redeveloped the former civil defense.
In 2013 work began on upgrading dell'aerea Airport Land Side (new parking lots and demolition of the old control tower) and installation of the new tower control high 15 m.

Facilities
The airport has a runway with an extension of 910 meters x 18 in asphalt. The property offers many services including airport Flight Information Service (AFIS), Handling, Storage and Workshop aircraft.
There are also available at the airport a bar, a restaurant, the taxi service, and a car rental.

The nearest big airport is Pisa International Airport approximately 40 km from Lucca-Tassignano Airport.

References

Airports in Italy